Rifat Rimatovich Artikov (born 24 January 1983, in Tashkent Region) is an Uzbek decathlete.

His best points for a decathlon is 7,975, achieved when he finished first at the Uzbekistan Cup in Tashkent on 12 June 2011, which enabled him to qualify for the Olympic Games in London.

Achievements

External links
IAAF profile
London 2012 profile

Uzbekistani decathletes
Olympic athletes of Uzbekistan
Athletes (track and field) at the 2012 Summer Olympics
People from Tashkent Region
1983 births
Living people
Athletes (track and field) at the 2010 Asian Games
Asian Games competitors for Uzbekistan
21st-century Uzbekistani people